The Veliko Tarnovo–Ruse motorway is a planned motorway in Northern Bulgaria, that will link Veliko Tarnovo and Ruse, at the Danube border crossing to Romania. Along with the Hemus motorway (A2), the Veliko Tarnovo–Ruse motorway aims to provide motorway connection between Sofia and Bucharest, the capitals of Bulgaria and Romania. Also, it follows the route of European route E85 and Pan-European Corridor IX. In March 2015, a tender for conceptual design was announced.

On 7 December 2020, Bulgaria's Road Infrastructure Agency announced the tender for the first 75,6 km of the motorway, being divided into two lots: Ruse - Byala and the Byala bypass.

References

Motorways in Bulgaria
Proposed roads in Bulgaria